This is a list of highways in the Houston–The Woodlands-Sugar Land metropolitan area.

Freeways

Present

Under construction

Future

Red Bluff Freeway - planned from State Highway 146 southeast of Houston to Beltway 8.  Only frontage roads have been built.
 - Sections A, B, C, H, and I-1 of the Grand Parkway are in various stages of the planning process.
 - south-southeast of downtown.  The mainlanes planned to be built from its present terminus near University Drive (adjacent to the University of Houston) to south of Beltway 8.
 - The Fort Bend Tollway is planned to eventually be extended from its northern terminus at US 90A to the southwest corner of the 610 Loop.
 - The Hardy Toll Road has a proposal to be extended from its southern terminus at the North Loop to Downtown Houston. 
 - The Fort Bend section of the Westpark Tollway, known as the Fort Bend Westpark Tollway, will eventually be extended west to the growing suburb of Fulshear. It will then turn north and end at IH-10 around Pederson Road.

Limited-access highways

Present

Allen Parkway - Between I-45 and Shepherd Drive, a distance of 2.3 miles (3.7 km), Allen Parkway is a limited access parkway.
Grand Parkway - Parts of section D (south of the Westpark Tollway) are now being brought up to full freeway standards.
Memorial Drive - From Houston Street to just west of Shepherd Drive, a distance of 2.3 miles (3.7 km), Memorial Drive is a limited-access parkway with exits at Heights Blvd./Waugh Drive and Shepherd Drive.
U.S. Highway 90 Alternate — South Main Street — south-southwest of downtown from I-610 to near the Southwest Freeway.
 - From the Harris-Fort Bend county line to the Harris-Montgomery county line for a total distance of 75 miles. Interstate 69 will travel from the U.S.–Mexico border in Brownsville, TX to the U.S.–Canada border in Port Huron, MI when completed in the future. US 59 travels from the U.S.–Mexico border in Laredo, TX to the U.S.–Canada border near Lancaster, MN. 35 miles of US 59 have been designated and dual signed as I-69/US 59 northeast of Downtown Houston. 28 miles of US 59 have been designated and dual signed as I-69/US 59 southwest of Downtown Houston. 12 miles of US 59 have been designated and dual signed as I-69/US 59 through Downtown Houston.

Gallery

References

Freeways
Houston
Hou
Highways